Ronald John Tilton (born August 9, 1963) is an American former college and professional football player who was a guard in the National Football League (NFL) for a single season in 1986.  Tilton played college football for the University of Florida and Tulane University, and thereafter, he played professionally for the Washington Redskins of the NFL.

Early years 

Tilton was born in Homestead, Florida.  He attended Plant High School in Tampa, Florida, where he played high school football for the Plant Panthers.

College career 

Tilton attended the University of Florida in Gainesville, Florida, where he played for coach Charley Pell's Florida Gators football team in 1981 and 1982.  Tilton transferred to Tulane University in New Orleans, Louisiana, and played his final two college football seasons for the Tulane Green Wave football team in 1984 and 1985.

Professional career 

Tilton was not selected in the 1986 NFL Draft.

See also 

 Florida Gators football, 1980–89
 List of Washington Redskins players

References 

1963 births
Living people
American football offensive guards
Florida Gators football players
People from Homestead, Florida
Sportspeople from Miami-Dade County, Florida
Players of American football from Tampa, Florida
Tulane Green Wave football players
Washington Redskins players
Henry B. Plant High School alumni